Linux Software Map (LSM) is a standard text file format for describing Linux software.  It also refers to the database constructed from these files.  LSM is one of the standard methods for announcing a new software release for Linux.

File format 
If a Linux program is to be distributed widely, an LSM file may be created to describe the program, normally in a file called software_package_name.lsm. It has one field on each line. The field name is separated from the value by a colon. Mandatory fields are Title, Version, Entered-date, Description, Author and Primary-site.

Example
Here is a what a blank LSM template looks like, at time of writing:
 Begin4
 Title:
 Version:
 Entered-date:
 Description:
 Keywords:
 Author:
 Maintained-by:
 Primary-site:
 Alternate-site:
 Original-site:
 Platforms:
 Copying-policy:
 End

Database 
The collective database of LSM entries can be searched in order to locate software of a particular type.  This database has passed through various owners.  It was created by Jeff Kopmanis, Lars Wirzenius maintained it for a while, and now the current maintainer is Aaron Schrab (with help from volunteers).

The database can be downloaded in its entirety, or one can perform limited queries using a web interface.

External links 
LSM template version 4 on ibiblio.org
Entire LSM Database
Simple LSM Search on ibiblio.org
Advanced LSM Search on ibiblio.org
Instructions for New Entries

Linux
Computer file formats